The anterior sacrococcygeal ligament or ventral sacrococcygeal ligament consists of a few irregular fibers, which descend from the anterior surface of the sacrum to the front of the coccyx, blending with the periosteum.

This short ligament forms the continuation of the anterior longitudinal ligament and stretches over the sacrococcygeal symphysis.

See also
 Posterior sacrococcygeal ligament
 Coccydynia (coccyx pain, tailbone pain)
 Ganglion impar

Notes

References 
 
 
 
 

Ligaments of the torso
Bones of the vertebral column